Maja Tat a mountain at 2,543 m high found in the northern part of Albania in the Accursed Mountains range. 

Maja Radohimës at 2,570 m high is found close to Maja Tat in its eastern direction. It is known for its steep and dangerous slopes and rocky, limestone summit.

Mountains of Albania
Accursed Mountains